Monterey High School, also known as Highland High School, Monterey Elementary School, Highland Elementary School, and Highland Center, is a historic school building located at Monterey, Highland County, Virginia. It was built in 1922, and is a one-story, hipped roof garnet sandstone structure in the Classical Revival-style. The three-bay facade consists of two side classroom wings with the central entry portico. It has a multiple hipped roof, symmetrical facade, and portico supported by Doric order columns.  The school closed in 1997, and subsequently housed the Highland Center.

It was listed on the National Register of Historic Places in 2002.

References

External links

Owner's website

School buildings on the National Register of Historic Places in Virginia
Neoclassical architecture in Virginia
School buildings completed in 1922
Schools in Highland County, Virginia
National Register of Historic Places in Highland County, Virginia
1922 establishments in Virginia